Emiliano Bombini (1543–1592) was a Roman Catholic prelate who served as Bishop of Umbriatico (1579–1592).

Biography
Emiliano Bombini was born in 1543.
On 16 Mar 1579, he was appointed during the papacy of Pope Gregory XIII as Bishop of Umbriatico. 
He served as Bishop of Umbriatico until his death in 1592.

References

External links and additional sources
 (for Chronology of Bishops) 
 (for Chronology of Bishops) 

16th-century Italian Roman Catholic bishops
Bishops appointed by Pope Gregory XIII
1543 births
1592 deaths